Jehan-Jacques Blancpain (born 1693) was a Swiss industrialist at the beginning of the eighteenth century. Blancpain is a notable figure in the history of watchmaking, who created the Blancpain company in 1735, in the town of Villeret, of which he was mayor.

References

Swiss watchmakers (people)
1693 births
Year of death missing